Inbal Shemesh (ענבל שמש; born 14 December 1996) is an Israeli judoka.

She competes in the under 63 kg weight category, and won a silver medal in the 2019 Tel Aviv Grand Prix.

Earlier in her career, Shemesh won bronze medals at the 2013 European U18 Championships, the 2016 European U21 Championships and the 2018 European U23 Championships.

Shemesh won a gold medal at the 2017 Maccabiah Games.

Throughout 2022, Shemesh has won two gold medals at IJF Grand Slams. Her first was in June at the 2022 Judo Grand Slam Tbilisi with a finals win over 2008 Olympic bronze medalist Ketleyn Quadros of Brazil. Her second was in November at the 2022 Judo Grand Slam Baku with an ippon in golden score against Geke van den Berg of the Netherlands.

Titles
Source:

References

External links
 
 
 Inbal Shemesh at the European Judo Union
 

1996 births
Living people
Israeli female judoka
Jewish martial artists
Jewish Israeli sportspeople
Maccabiah Games gold medalists for Israel
Maccabiah Games medalists in judo
Competitors at the 2017 Maccabiah Games